Usatine Media is a medical mobile app development company that was founded in 2010 by Dr. Richard P. Usatine and software developer Peter Erickson. Usatine Media produces numerous mobile apps available for iOS
 and Android devices across many fields of healthcare, including but not limited to Family Medicine, Internal Medicine, Surgery, Dermatology, Anatomy, and Emergency Medicine.  Most of the apps have been created in partnership with McGraw-Hill Education and Elsevier. "Dermoscopy, Two Step Algorithm" was created in collaboration with 3Gen and Dr. Ash Marghoob. It is available for free for iOS and Android. It is typically the top dermoscopy app in the iTunes app store. A number of these apps have been reviewed by www.iMedicalApps.com, including ABSITE Slayer
 and Color Atlas of Family Medicine 2/E.

Recognition
 Usatine Media's Color Atlas of Family Medicine 2/E app has been listed on “30 Best Nursing Apps 2016” published by Post University blog
 Usatine Media's "Lange Top 300 Pharmacy Drug Cards 2014-2015" app has been listed on "The best pharmacy apps for iPad" published by www.apppicker.com
 Usatine Media's Color Atlas of Family Medicine 2/E app has been listed on “Apps Every Nurse Should Be Using” published by Online LPN to RN
 Usatine Media's "Pocket Atlas of Emergency Ultrasound" app has been listed on "Top 5 Emergency Medicine Ultrasound Apps" published by www.iMedicalApps.com

See also 
Richard P. Usatine

References

External links
Usatine Media

Software companies of the United States
Technology companies established in 2010